Remo Lederer (born 19 December 1968, in Rodewisch) is a retired German ski jumper.

In the World Cup he finished three times among the top 10, his best result being a third place from St. Moritz in January 1988. He also competed at the 1988 Winter Olympics.

References

External links

1968 births
Living people
People from Rodewisch
People from Bezirk Karl-Marx-Stadt
German male ski jumpers
Sportspeople from Saxony
Olympic ski jumpers of East Germany
Ski jumpers at the 1988 Winter Olympics